The 1874 Alabama gubernatorial election took place on November 3, 1874, in order to elect the governor of Alabama. Incumbent Republican David P. Lewis unsuccessfully ran for reelection, losing to Democratic former U.S. Representative George S. Houston. This election would start a 112-year win streak for Democrats in the gubernatorial level.

Results

References

1874
gubernatorial
Alabama
November 1874 events